National Evangelical School can refer to:
Evangelical School of Smyrna
National Evangelical School (Homs, Syria)
The National Evangelical School in Nabatieh – NESN